The Chicago Alternative Comics Expo (widely known as CAKE) is a comic book festival usually held each June in Chicago. Inaugurated in 2012, the curated festival showcases graphic novels, comic books, minicomics, and zines created by independent artists and publishers. CAKE focuses on the art of comics, and unlike traditional comic book conventions, does not feature much in the way of cosplaying, collectibles, back-issue dealers, or mainstream superhero publishers. Instead, the show centers around an artist alley-style exhibition space that features roughly 200 vendors, as well as industry-related panel discussions. The festival gives out the CupCake Awards, geared toward minicomic self-publishers.

History
The Chicago Alternative Comics Expo was co-founded by Edie Fake and Neil Brideau, both then employees at the Chicago independent bookstore Quimby's. The show was designed to honor Chicago's legacy as a home for small-press and self-publishing cartoonists. 

CAKE was inaugurated as a two-day event on June 16–17, 2012, at 1104 S. Wabash (The Ludington Building), part of the campus of Columbia College Chicago. Sponsors included Quimby's Bookstore, the Art Institute of Chicago, and Columbia College Chicago, some of whose venues hosted concurrent events related to the show.

The event moved to the Center on Halsted, an LGBT community center, in 2013.

The convention achieved nonprofit organization status in 2015.

In 2020, CAKE announced it was leaving its long-time location at Center on Halsted, and relocating to the Broadway Armory, located in Chicago's Edgewater neighborhood. However, the 2020, 2021, and 2022 events were canceled due to the COVID-19 pandemic. 

The organizers have announced that the in-person show will return in 2023.

Event history

CupCake Award 
The CupCake Award is a juried prize that is presented annually at CAKE to a local minicomic creator. It comes with $250 to use toward printing a new minicomic, half a table at that year's show, and the "support" of a local mentor.

Notes

References

External links
 

Book fairs in the United States
Comics conventions in the United States
June events
Annual events in Illinois
Recurring events established in 2012
2012 establishments in Illinois
Conventions in Chicago
Festivals established in 2012
Comics conventions